Coniothyrium is a genus of fungi in the family Phaeosphaeriaceae. The genus was circumscribed by Czech mycologist August Carl Joseph Corda in 1840.

Species

C. acaciae
C. ampelopsidis-hederaceae
C. bambusicola
C. batumense
C. boydeanum
C. caespitulosum
C. carpaticum
C. celmisiae
C. celtidis-australis
C. cerealis
C. clematidis-rectae
C. coffeae
C. concentricum
C. conicola
C. conoideum
C. conorum
C. crepinianum
C. cupressacearum
C. cydoniae
C. dispersellum
C. dracaenae
C. equiseti
C. ferrarisianum
C. fluviatile
C. fraxini
C. genistae
C. glomerulatum
C. henriquesii
C. ilicinum
C. ilicis
C. insitivum
C. jasmini
C. juniperi
C. kallangurense
C. lavandulae
C. leguminum
C. lignorum
C. obiones
C. olivaceum
C. opuntiae
C. palmarum
C. palmicola
C. palmigenum
C. phormii
C. platani
C. populinum
C. psammae
C. pteridis
C. quercinum
C. rhododendri
C. rosarum
C. sarothamni
C. slaptoniense
C. sphaerospermum
C. tamaricis
C. tamarisci
C. terricola
C. ulmeum
C. wernsdorffiae

References

Pleosporales
Dothideomycetes genera
Taxa named by August Carl Joseph Corda
Taxa described in 1840